Anne Mulder (born 14 December 1969) is a Dutch politician and former civil servant. A member of the People's Party for Freedom and Democracy (VVD), he served in the House of Representatives from 2010 to 2020, where he focused on matters of health care insurance, prevention and pharmaceutics. Since 2020, he has been an alderman in the municipal executive of The Hague.

Education and early career
A native of Hoogeveen, Mulder studied political economy at Erasmus University Rotterdam. As a conscripted soldier he served with the UNPROFOR in Dutchbat III in Bosnia and Herzegovina. Mulder worked as an inspector at the Ministry of Finance from 1996 to 2000, as a collaborator to the VVD's parliamentary group in the House of Representatives from 2000 to 2004 and as a policy advisor to the Ministry of the Interior and Kingdom Relations from 2004 to 2005. Between 2005 and 2015, he also worked as consultant with public affairs firm Pauw Sanders Zeilstra Van Spaendonck (PSZVS) in The Hague.

Political career
Mulder held a seat in the municipal council of The Hague from 2002 to 2010, where he chaired the party group from 2006 until 2010.

In Parliament, Mulder served on the Defence Committee; the Committee on European Affairs; the Finance Committee; the Committee on Foreign Affairs; the Committee on Foreign Trade and Development Cooperation; the Committee on Infrastructure and the Environment; and the Committee on Security and Justice. In this capacity, he was the Parliament's co-rapporteur on Brexit from 2019 alongside Pieter Omtzigt and Kees Verhoeven.

In addition to his role in Parliament, Mulder served as a member of the Dutch delegation to the Parliamentary Assembly of the Council of Europe from 2016. As a member of the Alliance of Liberals and Democrats for Europe, he was a member of the Committee on Political Affairs and Democracy and a member of the Committee on the Honouring of Obligations and Commitments by Member States of the Council of Europe (Monitoring Committee). In this capacity, he served as one of the Assembly's co-rapporteurs (alongside Emanuelis Zingeris) on Montenegro. Mulder was a member of a cross-party delegation to observe the 2016 presidential elections in Bulgaria and the 2017 presidential elections in Serbia.

In 2020, Mulder resigned his seat in the House of Representatives two days after he was appointed alderman for finance in The Hague. He succeeded Boudewijn Revis. In 2021, Mulder was chosen as the VVD lead candidate (lijsttrekker) for the 2022 municipal election in The Hague.

Electoral history

Decorations

References

External links 
  Personal website
  Parlement.com biography
  House of Representatives biography
  People's Party for Freedom and Democracy website

1969 births
Living people
20th-century Dutch civil servants
21st-century Dutch civil servants
21st-century Dutch politicians
Aldermen of The Hague
Dutch consultants
Dutch economists
Dutch officials of the United Nations
Dutch public relations people
Erasmus University Rotterdam alumni
Knights of the Order of Orange-Nassau
Members of the House of Representatives (Netherlands)
Municipal councillors of The Hague
People from Hoogeveen
People's Party for Freedom and Democracy politicians
Royal Netherlands Army personnel
United Nations personnel in the Bosnian War
United Nations Protection Force soldiers